The United States District Court for the Middle District of Florida (in case citations, M.D. Fla.) is a federal court in the Eleventh Circuit (except for patent claims and claims against the U.S. government under the Tucker Act, which are appealed to the Federal Circuit).

The District was established on July 30, 1962, with parts of the Northern and Southern Districts transferring into the newly created Middle District 

 the United States Attorney for the District is Roger B. Handberg.

Organization of the court 
The United States District Court for the Middle District of Florida is one of three federal judicial districts in Florida. Court for the District is held at Fort Myers, Jacksonville, Ocala, Orlando, and Tampa.

Fort Myers Division comprises the following counties: Charlotte, Collier, Desoto, Glades, Hendry, and Lee.

Jacksonville Division comprises the following counties: Baker, Bradford, Clay, Columbia, Duval, Flagler, Hamilton, Nassau, Putnam, St. Johns, Suwannee, and Union.

Ocala Division comprises the following counties: Citrus, Lake, Marion, and Sumter.

Orlando Division comprises the following counties: Brevard, Orange, Osceola, Seminole, and Volusia.

Tampa Division comprises the following counties: Hardee, Hernando, Hillsborough, Manatee, Pasco, Pinellas, Polk, and Sarasota.

Current judges 
:

Vacancies and pending nominations

Former judges

Chief judges

Succession of seats

Courthouse history 
 Completed in 1908 by architect John Knox Taylor, the historic Federal courthouse in Tampa stands as the only civic building constructed in the eclectic renaissance style. Initially serving as a U.S. Post Office, the courthouse moved two blocks down to its current location in 1998. Congress named the court in honor of long-time Tampa representative and University of Florida Law alumnus Sam Gibbons; the congressman is largely recognized as the founder of the University of South Florida.

See also 
 Courts of Florida
 List of current United States district judges
 List of United States federal courthouses in Florida
 Playboy Enterprises, Inc. v. Frena (1993)
 United States Court of Appeals for the Eleventh Circuit
 United States District Court for the Northern District of Florida
 United States District Court for the Southern District of Florida

References

External links 
 Official website for the U.S. District Court for the MDFL
 Official website for the U.S. Attorney's Office for the MDFL

Florida, Middle
Florida law
Nassau County, Florida
Lee County, Florida
Government of Jacksonville, Florida
Suwannee County, Florida
Marion County, Florida
Government of Orlando, Florida
Government of St. Petersburg, Florida
Government of Tampa, Florida
1962 establishments in Florida
Courthouses in Florida
Courts and tribunals established in 1962